Boje Postel (8 April 1890 – 6 January 1980) was a German-British painter.

Early life
Boje Postel was born on 8 April 1890 in Hemmerwurth in the rural west of Schleswig-Holstein in the north of Germany. He was the son of a farmer.

Professional life
At the age of 14 Postel discovered his love for the arts after he had seen paintings by Édouard Manet and Max Liebermann. At this age he started spending his time in the countryside painting and drawing. When he finished school in 1908, he left the countryside to go to Hamburg to study with various painters including Arthur Siebelist.

Postel then moved onto Berlin and undertook private studies with Wilhelm Mueller-Schoenfeld. He was also taught by Martin Brandenburg and Lovis Corinth. He then met Max Liebermann. Postel was very much influenced by Liebermann's art and the surrounding artist movement, the Berlin Secession. He was able to exhibit his work within this movement first in 1912 in Berlin.

Postel was drafted by the German military before the 1st World War and sustained tuberculosis. It took him quite a bit of time to recover from that disease. Beginning in 1922, Postel travelled extensively to England, Spain the Netherlands, Italy and France. He received further influences from Fauvism and Cubism. Both influences led to a step-by-step move away from impressionist art. In 1924 Postel settled in London but still had a room in Berlin. In 1927 he had a room in Nr 213 Kurfuerstendamm in Berlin. After 1933, Postel's mentor Max Liebermann fell in disgrace with the National Socialist regime and resigned as president of the Prussian Academy of Arts in 1932. Postel left Germany and spent the following years with travel to the Netherlands, Majorca and Maribor in present-day Slovenia. The fate of German artists in exile during the years 1933-1945 has been described in detail elsewhere.

In 1936, Postel and his wife Nina went into exile and settled in London. Postel made a living with teaching and freelance painting. He spent the years between 1941 and 1944 in an internment camp for Germans in exile on the Isle of Man. Owing to the relatively benign conditions there, Postel was able to continue drawing and painting, both landscapes and portrait work. A number of his portraits from this period have survived although many of the sitters remain unknown to the present day. It is assumed that they were mainly fellow camp inmates many of them presumably German intellectuals, artists and scientists in exile. Back in London in 1944 he continued his teaching as well as freelance painting to make a living. He would often spend his time in parks in London teaching children basic drawing and sketching techniques. Numerous landscapes from this period depict landscapes in London such as Hyde Park. These activities continued in the post-war years. Postel's first wife Nina died in 1960. The following years saw him alternating between Germany and Britain. He had a number of exhibitions in Germany, France and the UK.

Later life

In 1972, he married his second wife Marjorie in Surrey. Boje Postel died on 6 January 1980 in Purley, Surrey.

Work
Boje Postel's work focuses on portraits as well as nature and scenes from city life. Most of his works are drawings in black and white and portraits.  A good example, a print of a portrait drawing of German journalist Maximilian Harden, is in the Harvard Art Collection. There are also quite a few water colours such as park landscapes. Postel also left behind a large number of sketches both landscape and portrait. He also enjoyed sketching his dog Chuta who he had picked up during his travels near Maribor in present day Slovenia. The catalogue of the 1996 exhibition in Wilhelmshaven/Germany gives a good overview of his career with photos of many of his key works, as does a private website on his life and work.

References
Kuester, Bernd. Boje Postel. 1890 - 1980. Ein Impressionist in der Emigration. Bremen: Donat Verlag (1996).

Footnotes

External links

1890 births
1980 deaths
People from Dithmarschen
20th-century German painters
20th-century German male artists
20th-century British painters
British male painters
German male painters
German emigrants to the United Kingdom
20th-century British male artists